Emilie Nicolas Kongshavn (born 26 November 1987) is a Norwegian singer-songwriter from Bærum. She is best known for her jazz-inspired vocals and electronic sound. She has released 3 studio albums and has won 4 Norwegian Grammys (Spellemannprisen): two for Best Pop Artist in 2014 and 2018, one for Best Debut Album (Like I’m a Warrior) in 2014, and one for Album of the Year (Tranquille Emile) in 2018.

Discography

Albums 
 Like I'm a Warrior (2014)
 Tranquille Emile (2018)
Let Her Breathe (2020)

Singles 
 "Grown Up" (2013)
 "Pstereo" (2013)
 "Sky" (2017)
 "Higher Love" (2018)
 "Wild One" (2018)
 "Feel Fine" (2018)
 "Who’s Gonna Love You" (2020)
 "If I Call" (2020)

References 

Living people
Musicians from Bærum
Norwegian songwriters
English-language singers from Norway
1987 births
21st-century Norwegian singers
21st-century Norwegian women singers